Stefano Fieschi (Latin Stephanus Fliscus or Philiscus) of Soncino, was a 15th-century Italian scholar, episcopal secretary, and pedagogue.

Biography 
Fliscus was a student of the famous rhetorician Gasparino Barzizza from about 1429–1430.  He was a secretary to Zenone Castiglione, bishop of Lisieux.

Works 
Fliscus is best known for his Sententiarum variationes seu Synonyma, a collection of sentences in Latin and other languages as an aid for letter-writing. This popular collection was republished as part of Albrecht von Eyb's Praecepta artis rhetoricae and Margarita poetica.  Succeeding editions included German, Italian, Dutch, French, and Spanish sentence equivalents.  The Spanish version was printed by Antonio de Nebrija's publisher.  Fliscus also published a version under the title De componendis epistolis.

See also 
 Janua linguarum reserata

References 

15th-century Italian writers
15th-century Latin writers
People from Soncino
Secretaries
Rhetoric
Italian schoolteachers
Italian Renaissance writers
Italian Renaissance humanists
Italian scholars
Italian male writers
Grammarians from Italy

Year of birth unknown

Year of death unknown